Justin Fisher is an American born bassist most well known for being the bassist in Nerf Herder, touring bassist for The Rentals and lead singer for Psoma. Fisher also co-founded Rivers Cuomo's first band Avant Garde.

Fisher played guitar and was the backing vocalist for Shufflepuck who were signed to Interscope records in the 1990s.

Justin joined Nerf Herder in 1999 and played bass and keywords on the albums How To Meet Girls, My EP, American Cheese.  During this time Justin was also the touring bassist for The Rentals. In 2003 and 2004 Justin also contributed vocals on Matt Sharp's solo album and EP.

Fisher is also the primary songwriter, lead vocalist and guitarist in the band Psoma who have released two albums and one EP.

Recently Justin played bass on the 2013 AM Radio album Shine and joined the new lineup of Ridel High playing bass and has been releasing solo songs via his own Soundcloud account.

References

American rock bass guitarists
American male bass guitarists
Living people
Place of birth missing (living people)
Nerf Herder members
Ridel High members
1970 births
21st-century American bass guitarists
21st-century American male musicians